Gnathostenetroididae is a family of crustaceans belonging to the order Isopoda.

Genera:
 Caecostenetroides Fresi & Schiecke, 1968
 Gnathostenetroides Amar, 1957
 Maresiella Fresi & Scipione, 1980
 Neostenetroides Carpenter & Magniez, 1982
 Wiyufiloides Pérez-Schultheiss & Wilson, 2021

References

Isopoda